DevMountain is a private coding bootcamp school that offers in-person and online courses ranging from 6 to 26 weeks in a variety of subjects including web development, mobile programming, user experience design, software quality assurance, and salesforce development. The school was founded in Provo, Utah by Cahlan Sharp, Tyler Richards, and Colt Henrie in 2013.

In April 2016, the software engineering school, DevMountain was acquired by Capella Education Company for $20 million.

References

External links

2013 establishments in Utah
Computer science education
Companies based in Utah